Aleksandr Valeryevich Mokin (born 19 June 1981) is a Kazakh professional footballer who plays as a goalkeeper for FC Tobol and the Kazakhstan national football team.

Career

Club

Mokin started his career with Ordabasy.
 
On 23 February 2016, Mokin signed for Kazakhstan Premier League Champions FC Astana.

On 4 January 2019, Mokin signed for Irtysh Pavlodar, but left the club on 16 January 2019 citing family reasons. Mokin was released by Astana on 6 January 2020 after his contract expired.

On 22 February 2020, Mokin signed for FC Tobol.In February 2023, Mokin left  «Tobol».

Career statistics

Club

International

Honours
Zhenis Astana/Astana
Kazakhstan Premier League (1): 2006
Kazakhstan Cup (2): 2002, 2005

Shakhter Karagandy
Kazakhstan Premier League (1): 2011, 2012
Kazakhstan Cup (1): 2013
Kazakhstan Super Cup (1): 2013

Astana
Kazakhstan Premier League (1): 2016, 2017, 2018, 2019
Kazakhstan Cup (1): 2016
Kazakhstan Super Cup (1): 2018, 2019

Tobol/Tobol
Kazakhstan Super Cup (1): 2021

References

External links

Living people
1981 births
Kazakhstani people of Russian descent
Kazakhstani footballers
Association football goalkeepers
Kazakhstan international footballers
Kazakhstan Premier League players
FC Okzhetpes players
FC Ordabasy players
FC Shakhter Karagandy players
FC Zhenis Astana players
FC Astana players
FC Tobol players
People from Shymkent